Luib is a crofting and fishing settlement on the south east shore of the sea loch,  Loch Ainort near Broadford, on the island of Skye in Scotland. It is in the council area of Highland.The settlement of Dunan is  directly east of Luib, along the A87 coast road.

The Game of Luib was founded in the town of Luib, Scotland, in 1987 by Richard Calland, Martin Cook, Martin Curlew & Andrew Feeley (“The Founding Fathers of the Game of Luib”).

Gallery

References

Populated places in the Isle of Skye